Catrinel Dumitrescu (born 11 October 1956) is a Romanian film and theater actress.

Born in Brăila, her debut came when she was 16, and was selected by director Alexandru Tocilescu to play a role at the local theater in the play  by August Strindberg. From 1974 to 1989 she played at the Lucian Blaga National Theater in Cluj-Napoca.

She has appeared in more than fifty films since 1977. She was married to actor Emil Hossu.

In December 2002 she was awarded by Romanian President Ion Iliescu the National Order of Merit, Knight rank. In 2012 she received the Gopo Award for best supporting actress for her role in the movie Aurora.

Selected filmography

References

External links 

1956 births
Living people
People from Brăila
20th-century Romanian actresses
21st-century Romanian actresses
Caragiale National University of Theatre and Film alumni
Recipients of the National Order of Merit (Romania)